Bautino (Bautin, باۋتىين) is a town in Mangystau Region, southwest Kazakhstan. It has a population of 3,247.

References

Cities and towns in Kazakhstan
Populated places in Mangystau Region